The 1958 Iowa gubernatorial election was held on November 4, 1958. Incumbent Democrat Herschel C. Loveless defeated Republican nominee William G. Murray with 54.13% of the vote.

Primary elections
Primary elections were held on June 2, 1958.

Democratic primary

Candidates
Herschel C. Loveless, incumbent Governor

Results

Republican primary

Candidates
William G. Murray, Iowa State University Economics Professor
William H. Nicholas, incumbent Lieutenant Governor

Results

General election

Candidates
Herschel C. Loveless, Democratic 
William G. Murray, Republican

Results

References

1958
Iowa
Gubernatorial